The 1987–88 Season was year of moderate improvement for Hibs. Attendances were up significantly on the previous year, and the sixth-place finish in the league was better than 1987's ninth place. They narrowly lost out to Motherwell in the fourth round of the League cup. In the Scottish cup, Hibs took Celtic to a lucrative fourth round home replay in the Scottish cup. They narrowly lost, but the turnout of 24,000 was one of the best gates of recent years at Easter Road.

Scottish Premier Division

Final League table

Scottish League Cup

Scottish Cup

See also
List of Hibernian F.C. seasons

References

External links
Hibernian 1987/1988 results and fixtures, Soccerbase

Hibernian F.C. seasons
Hibernian